Baggage is any number of bags, cases and containers which hold a traveller's articles during transit.

Baggage may also refer to:

Television

Series
 Baggage (American game show), a 2010 dating game show hosted by Jerry Springer
 Baggage (British game show), based on the US version

Episodes
 "Baggage" (The Americans)
 "Baggage" (Everybody Loves Raymond)
 "Baggage" (The Handmaid's Tale)
 "Baggage" (House)
 "Baggage" (Law & Order: Criminal Intent)

Other uses
 Baggage (album), a 2000 album by Sirsy
 "Baggage", a song by Gryffin from Gravity
 Baggage (radio show), a BBC Radio 4 situation comedy
 Emotional baggage, a colloquialism referring to unresolved psychological issues